Before Dark was an American R&B girl group that originated in the late 1990s. The group consisted of sisters Arike Rice and Jeni Rice Genzuk (AKA Jeni G.), and their friend Mia Wright (née Lee), all from South Central Los Angeles.<ref name="Bessman">Bessman, Jim (2000) "[https://books.google.com/books?id=8A4EAAAAMBAJ&dq=%22before+dark%22+arike+jeni&pg=PA31 Before Dark Goes 'Daydreamin on RCA]", Billboard, April 22, 2000, p. 31. Retrieved January 7, 2014</ref> The group released the album Daydreamin' on July 11, 2000, on the RCA Records label with a single called "Baby" featuring rapper Solé. They also made a guest appearance on Tyrese's self-titled debut album. Later in 2000, the single "Monica" hit #77 on the Billboard Top 100 chart and #7 on the Billboard R&B sales chart. The group disbanded in 2001.

Arike Rice was formerly a member of the 90's group Voices when she was nine. She also appeared in the musical films Dreamgirls, as a member of 'The Stepp Sisters', and Hairspray, as a member of "The Dynamites" in 2006 and 2007 respectively. Mia Lee married basketball player Dorrell Wright in 2014. Lastly, Jeni G. became a writer and supervising producer for The CW/Black Entertainment Television series The Game, which starred her sister Arike's former Voices singing member Tia Mowry. She is currently a writer and a supervising producer of the American Broadcasting Company series Black-ish, for which she was nominated for an Emmy Award in 2016.

Discography

Album
2000: Daydreamin'''

Singles

References

American contemporary R&B musical groups
Musical groups established in 1998
American girl groups
Musical groups disestablished in 2001
African-American musical groups

African-American girl groups